The 2017 Merrimack Warriors football team represented Merrimack College as a member of the Northeast-10 Conference (NE-10) during the 2017 NCAA Division II football season. Led by fifth-year head coach Dan Curran, Merrimack compiled an overall record of 4–6 with a mark of 4–5 in conference play, placing seventh in the NE-10. The Warriors played their home games at Martone–Mejail Field until October, when Duane Stadium opened.

Previous season
The Warriors finished the 2016 season 3–8, 2–7 in NE-10 Conference play.

Schedule

References

Merrimack
Merrimack Warriors football seasons
Merrimack Warriors football